Pape Moussa Diakhaté (born 22 April 1989) is a Senegalese footballer who currently plays for Thonon Évian.

Biography
At age 18, he signed a 5-year contract with Italian Serie A club Fiorentina. In August 2009, he was loaned to Belgian Second Division for Eupen, made la Viola had a quota to register a new non-EU signing from abroad. Fiorentina later obtained 2 quotas and registered Keirrison and Adem Ljajić in January 2010.

He won promotion to Belgian First Division in June 2010. The club later kept Diakhatè in Eupen for another season, and his viola team-mate Matthias Lepiller and Jefferson also joined him on loan.

References

External links
 

1989 births
Living people
People from Dakar Region
Senegalese footballers
Association football midfielders
ACF Fiorentina players
K.A.S. Eupen players
Belgian Pro League players
Senegalese expatriate footballers
Expatriate footballers in Italy
Senegalese expatriate sportspeople in Italy
Expatriate footballers in Belgium
Senegalese expatriate sportspeople in Belgium
Expatriate footballers in Romania
Senegalese expatriate sportspeople in Romania